"Young Forever" is a 2009 song by Jay-Z.

Young Forever may also refer to:

 Young Forever (album) or the title song, by Aberfeldy, 2004
 "Young Forever" (The Ready Set song), 2011
 "Young Forever", a song by Eric Paslay, 2018
 "Young Forever", a song by JR JR, 2019
 "Young Forever", a song by Nicki Minaj from Pink Friday: Roman Reloaded, 2012

See also
 The Most Beautiful Moment in Life: Young Forever, an album by BTS, 2016
 Forever Young (disambiguation)